International Relations and Global Climate Change is a 2001 book edited by Urs Luterbacher and Detlef F. Sprinz. It was published by MIT Press. The book includes a critical review of international relations literature in relation to climate issues. It includes conceptual, theoretical, and methodological analyses of global climate change politics. The book is an interdisciplinary overview.

References 

2001 non-fiction books
Climate change books
Books about international relations
MIT Press books